Big Bully may refer to:
 Jimmy Jacobs (born 1984), wrestler
 Big Bully (film), a 1996 American dark comedy film
 A boss in Super Mario 64, a 1996 platform video game